The St. Thomas Tommies women's ice hockey program represents St. Thomas University in the Atlantic University Sport conference of U Sports. In their 20-year history, the Tommies have featured 86 Academic All-Canadians. In 2019, the program captured their first-ever AUS championship.

History
In the 2015–16 season, the Tommies, led by captain Kelty Apperson, soared to a 16-7-1 regular season record. With 26 points, Apperson ranked second overall in the AUS scoring race. 

Finishing first place in the 2018-19 AUS regular season, boasting a 22-5-1 record, the Tommies goals against average of 1.58 ranked second in the conference. Among the most accomplished players of that season, Emily Oleksuk recorded a superlative 34 points, ranking second among all AUS skaters, fourth in U Sports. Of note, her 23 assists ranked first in both AUS and U Sports, also leading the Tommies in game-winning goals with seven, complemented by four power play goals and a plus-minus rating of +16. In the aftermath of the season, Oleksuk captured the AUS Top Defensive Player Award, a first in program history.

Season-by-season Record 
{| class="wikitable"
|-
| style="background:#fea;"|Won Championship
| style="background:#dfd;"|<small>'Lost Championship</small>
| style="background:#d0e7ff;"|Conference Champions
| style="background:#fbb;"|League Leader
|-
|
|
|
|
|}

Season team scoring champion

Team captains
2015-16: Kelty Apperson
2016-17: Kelty Apperson
2017-18:  
2018-19: Emily Oleksuk
2019-20: Emily Oleksuk

RivalriesUniversity of New BrunswickInternational
Kelty Apperson, Defense, : Ice hockey at the 2017 Winter Universiade 

Awards and honours
U Sports Awards
Kayla Blackmore: 2012-13 Marion Hilliard Award 

U Sports NationalsPlayer of the Game Award2016 CIS Women's Ice Hockey Championship

AUS Awards
Julia Sharun: 2008-09 AUS Rookie of the Year
Kayla Blackmore: 2010-11 AUS Most Sportsmanlike Player
Kayla Blackmore: 2012-13 AUS Community Service Award
Kelty Apperson: 2015-16 AUS Most Valuable Player
Becky Conner: 2016-17 AUS Most Sportsmanlike Player
Emily Oleksuk: 2018-19 AUS Top Defensive Player
Peter Murphy: 2018-19 AUS Coach of the Year

AUS All-Stars
First Team
 Kayla Blackmore, 2012-13
Kelty Apperson: 2015-16 First Team, 2016-17 First Team
Eliza Snider: 2016-17 First Team
Lauren Henman, Forward: 2018-19
Alexandra Woods, Defense: 2018-19

Second Team
Lucrèce Nussbaum. 2009-10 Second Team
 Kayla Blackmore, 2011-12
Jessie McCann: 2015-16 Second Team, 2016–17 Second Team
Abby Clarke, Goaltender: 2018-19
Emily Oleksuk, Forward: 2018-19

AUS All-Rookies
Julia Sharun: 2008-09 
Jessie McCann, Defense: 2015-16  
Lauren Legault, Forward: 2016-17 
Alexandra Woods, Defense: 2016-17

University Awards
Kelty Apperson: 2016 and 2017 St. Thomas University Tommies Coastal Graphics Female Athlete of the Year

Team AwardsMost Valuable Player1998-99: Kristy Dionne
1999-2000: Kristy Dionne
2000-01: Natalie Oake
2001-02: Cindy Fraser
2002-03: Hannah Muir
2003-04: Emily Hobbs
2006-07: Karlee Shields
2007-08: Ashley Duguay
2008-09: Julia Sharun
2009-10: Kayla Blackmore
2010-11: Kayla Blackmore
2011-12: Kayla Blackmore
2012-13: Kayla Blackmore
2013-14: Kristin Wolfe
2014-15: Kelty Apperson
2015-16: Kelty Apperson
2016-17: Kelty Apperson
2017-18: Abby Clarke
2018-19: Abby Clarke
2019-20: Emily OleksukMost Improved Player1999-2000: Stacey Kane
2001-02: Missy Cormier
2002-03: Alanna MacNevin
2003-04: Amy Simpson
2006-07: Renee Edison
2007-08: Renee Edison
2008-09: Nicole Dube
2009-10: Amanda Burns
2010-11: Andrea Fisher
2011-12: Carly Critch
2012-13: Stephanie Gates
2013-14: Laura Bray
2014-15:  Cassidy McTaggart
2015-16:  Samantha Squires
2016-17: Alisha Gilbert
2017-18: Mariah Carey
2018-19: Megan Pardy
2019-20: Mariah CareyRookie of the Year2001-02: Kelly Manual
2002-03: Hannah Muir
2003-04: Rebekah Thompson
2006-07: Karlee Shields
2007-08: Dominique Bernier
2008-09: Julia Sharun
2009-10: Amy Kelbaugh
2010-11: Jordan Miller
2011-12: Dani Miller
2012-13: Kelty Apperson
2013-14: Myfanwy Thomson
2014-15:  Becky Conner
2015-16: Emily Oleksuk
2016-17: Alex Woods
2017-18: Olivia Reid
2018-19: Florence Awde
2019-20: Caroline PietroskiTop Defensive Player''
2001-02: Kelly Manual
2002-03: Marie-Paule Deveau
2003-04: Kelly Manuel
2006-07: Rebekah Thompson
2007-08: Lucrece Nussbaum
2008-09: Lucrece Nussbaum
2009-10: Lucrece Nussbaum
2010-11: Courteney Fox
2011-12: Courteney Fox
2012-13: Courtney Fox
2013-14: Caley Steinert
2014-15:  Eliza Snider
2015-16: Eliza Snider and Caley Steinert
2016-17: Eliza Snider
2017-18: Alex Woods and Teah Anderson
2018-19: Emily Oleksuk
2019-20: Alex Woods

Tommies in professional hockey

References 

St. Thomas (Canada) Tommies women's ice hockey
U Sports women's ice hockey teams
Women's ice hockey teams in Canada